Carlo Borromeo (died 1540) was a Roman Catholic prelate who served as Bishop of Pozzuoli (1537–1540) and Bishop of Ugento (1530–1537).

Biography
On 9 March 1530, Carlo Borromeo was appointed during the papacy of Pope Clement VII as Bishop of Ugento.
On 6 July 1537, he was appointed during the papacy of Pope Paul III as Bishop of Pozzuoli.
He served as Bishop of Pozzuoli until his death in 1540.

References

External links and additional sources
 (for Chronology of Bishops) 
 (for Chronology of Bishops) 
 (for Chronology of Bishops) 
 (for Chronology of Bishops)  

Bishops of Pozzuoli
16th-century Italian Roman Catholic bishops
Bishops appointed by Pope Clement VII
Bishops appointed by Pope Paul III
1540 deaths